Jake Campos (born October 18, 1994) is a former American football offensive tackle. He was a member of the Dallas Cowboys of the National Football League (NFL). He played college football at Iowa State University.

Early years
Campos attended Valley High School, where he played football, basketball, baseball and track. He contributed to the school winning the Iowa prep Class 4A state championship. 

He placed third at the state track meet in the shot put as a junior. He received All-Conference honors both his junior and senior seasons. He received All-state honors as a senior. He earned academic honors all four years.

College career
Campos accepted a football scholarship from Iowa State University. As a redshirt freshman, he started three games at right tackle and the final eight contests at left tackle. 

As a sophomore, he was named the starter at left tackle. As a junior in 2016, he suffered a season-ending leg injury in fall camp. As a senior, he regained his starting position at left tackle. He finished his college career with 36 starts.

Professional career

Dallas Cowboys
Campos was signed as an undrafted free agent by the Dallas Cowboys after the 2018 NFL Draft on April 30. He was waived on September 1 and signed to the practice squad the next day. On January 14, 2019, he was signed to a future contract. He was released on August 31.

St. Louis BattleHawks (XFL)
In October 2019, he was selected by the St. Louis BattleHawks during phase 2 of the 2020 XFL Draft. He was named the starter at left tackle for the season opener and was moved to offensive guard for the second game. He was placed on the injured reserve list with a leg injury on February 17. In March, amid the COVID-19 pandemic, the league announced that it would be cancelling the rest of the season. He appeared in 2 out of 5 games. He had his contract terminated when the league suspended operations on April 10, 2020.

References

External links
Cyclones bio

Further reading

1994 births
Living people
People from West Des Moines, Iowa
Players of American football from Iowa
American football offensive tackles
Iowa State Cyclones football players
Dallas Cowboys players
St. Louis BattleHawks players